Inquisition may refer to:
Inquisition, a group of institutions within the judicial system of the Catholic Church and also the Protestant Church whose objective was to combat heresy.
Inquisitorial system, a common legal procedure where the tribunal is actively involved in determining the facts of the case

Historical events
 Goa Inquisition, run by Portuguese colonials in Goa for nearly 200 years
 Literary Inquisition in Chinese history
 Medieval Inquisition, including Episcopal Inquisition and Papal Inquisition
 Mexican Inquisition
 Inquisition of the Netherlands
 Peruvian Inquisition
 Portuguese Inquisition
 Roman Inquisition
 Spanish Inquisition, an ecclesiastical tribunal established in 1478 by King Ferdinand and Queen Isabella to maintain Catholic orthodoxy in their kingdoms
 Venetian Holy Inquisition

Literature
Inquisition: The Persecution and Prosecution of the Reverend Sun Myung Moon, a book by Carlton Sherwood about Sun Myung Moon
The New Inquisition, a book by Robert Anton Wilson critical of the application of the scientific method in the 20th century
 The Inquisition trilogy of trilogies, a Warhammer 40,000 9-book novel series composed of 3-trilogies by Dan Abnett
 Mass Effect: Inquisition, a 2010 webcomic based on the videogame series
 The Inquisition (underground newspaper), an underground newspaper from Charlotte, North Carolina, United States

Film and TV
 Inquisition (film), a 1976 Spanish historical horror film
Inquizition, a 1998–2001 game show
"The Spanish Inquisition" (Monty Python), a comedy sketch from which the phrase "Nobody expects the Spanish Inquisition!" originated

TV episodes
"The Inquisition" (Captain Scarlet), an episode of Captain Scarlet and the Mysterons
"Inquisition" (Star Trek: Deep Space Nine), an episode of Star Trek: Deep Space Nine
"Inquisition" (Stargate Atlantis), a 2008 episode of Stargate Atlantis.
"Inquisition" (The Unit), an episode of The Unit
"The Inquisition", an episode of the British-American animated television series The Amazing World of Gumball

Music
Inquisition (metal band), a Colombian-American black metal band
Inquisition (punk band), a hardcore punk band based in Richmond, Virginia, United States
"Inquisition" (song), a single by Skinny Puppy

Videogaming
Inquisition (video game), a 2002 video game by Wanadoo Edition
Dragon Age: Inquisition, a 2014 videogame, the third installment of the Dragon Age series 
Kult: Heretic KingdomsHeretic Kingdoms: The Inquisition, a 2004 videogame, first in the Heretic Kingdoms series

See also

 Spanish Inquisition (disambiguation)

Inquest